James Linwood Dawson, legally changed to Lin Dawson in 1993 (born June 24, 1959), is a former National Football League (NFL) player.  He serves as the Managing Director of The Lin Dawson Organization, LLC.

Lin grew up in Kinston, North Carolina.  After graduating from Kinston High School in 1977, he accepted a football scholarship from NC State University.  In 1981, he was drafted by the New England Patriots where he played ten years. A starter at tight-end, Dawson was injured on the first play from scrimmage in Super Bowl XX on an incomplete pass thrown to him by quarterback Tony Eason. He was a member of the New England Patriots ‘Team of the Decade-1980’s.

References

1959 births
Living people
Players of American football from Norfolk, Virginia
American football tight ends
NC State Wolfpack football players
New England Patriots players
Ed Block Courage Award recipients